Mignaloux-Beauvoir is a commune in the Vienne department in the Nouvelle-Aquitaine region in western France.

Geography

Climate 
Mignaloux-Beauvoir has an oceanic climate (subtype "Cfb" according to the Köppen Climate Classification). It is classified as an "altered oceanic climate" by Météo-France , a transition zone between the oceanic climate, the mountain climate and the semi-continental climate.

Communication routes and transport 
The railway line from Saint-Benoît to Le Blanc passes through the municipal territory. The town has a train station, served by trains between Poitiers and Limoges.

The town is crossed by two National Roads:

 The RN147, which connects Poitiers to Limoges, 
 The RN151, which connects Poitiers to Chauvigny.

Typology 
Mignaloux-Beauvoir is a rural municipality, with a majority of agricultural landuse (67,6% of the territory in 2018, down from 70,6% in 1990) and a minority of urban areas (13%), according to the Corine Land Cover classification . Ine 2020, the municipality is classified as a "low density municipality" on the Insee density grid .

It is part of the functional area of Poitiers, which includes 97 municipalities.

History 
The site of Mignaloux-Beauvoir has been occupied since protohistoric times. During the Antiquity, the site is crossed by two roman way.

The name "Mignaloux" appears cited in 848 under the Latin form villa exania magnolarum in a chart of the Nouaillé abbey, and the name "Beauvoir" is attested later, in 1187, referring to a commandery .

During the Middle Ages, multiple hamlets existed in the area. The two parishes of Beauvoir and Mignaloux depended on Poitiers. Several localities still bear the name of ecclesiastical properties.

During the Hundred Years' War, on September 16, 1356, during the Black Prince's chevauchée, the latter, leaving Châtellerault, rushed with 200 men-at-arms through the forest of Moulière and came out on the road from Poitiers to Chauvigny. There, he falls by surprise on the rearguard of the French army, 700 men-at-arms and knights strong, at the site of Chaboterie au Breuil l'Abbesse, located in the municipality. The French fled into the forest, losing 240 men including the counts of Joigny and Auxerre and the sieur de Châtillon. This marks the prelude to a catastrophic defeat for the kingdom of France.

In 1798 the two parishes were united into one municipality. The administrative center was attributed to Beauvoir, then Mignaloux. In 1819, the Poitiers - Limoges road was built across the municipality, literally cutting it in two. In 1892 the town hall and the school were built.

During the World War II, the Luftwaffe bombed the train station on June 19, 1940, without causing any casualties. During the summer of 1944, the Allied air forces carried out numerous strafing operations: fighters patrolled the axes (railways, main roads) in search of targets of opportunity (German convoy, military train, camp, etc.). This is how Allied fighters machine-gunned the station on June 16.

The population growth accelerated from 1968. The municipal boundaries changed in 1974 following the construction of the new university campus and the hospital center of Poitiers. From this date, the municipality, which was essentially rural until then, starts to urbanize.

Population

Points of interest
 Jardin botanique universitaire de Poitiers

See also
Communes of the Vienne department

References

Communes of Vienne